Percival Barnes Wood (22 December 1901 – 9 June 1941), known as "Barney", was an Australian sportsman who played both first-class cricket and Australian rules football. He was killed in action while serving with the Second AIF.

Family
One of four children, and the son of Robert Ellis Wood (1866–1944), and Nellie Elizabeth Wood (1872–1943), née Heywood, Percival Barnes Wood was born in Wellington, New Zealand on 22 December 1901.

Education
Educated at Melbourne Grammar School from 1911 to 1920, he was a prefect in 1919 and 1920, was the school's boxing champion on 1920, and played in the school's First XVIII from 1917 to 1920.

Football

Old Melburnians (MAFA)
He played for Old Melburnians Football Club for several years.

In 1925, he played in the centre, and was one of the best on the ground, for a combined Metropolitan Amateur Football Association (MAFA) team against a combined South Australian Amateur Football League (SAAFL) team at the M.C.G. on 8 June 1925.

Although he had been selected in the 1926 MAFA team to play against South Australia, in Adelaide, Wood surrendered his position in the team as he was unable to leave Melbourne for the trip to Adelaide.

Melbourne (VFL)
Wood was recruited to the Melbourne Football Club from Old Melburnians in 1928; he appeared in five senior games.

Perth (WAFA) 
He moved to Western Australia in 1928 for business reasons, where he played 20 matches for the Perth Football Club in 1929.

Cricket
Well-regarded as a schoolboy cricketer, he played cricket for the Melbourne Cricket Club from 1921/1922 until 1928/1929.

He toured New Zealand with a Melbourne Cricket Club team in 1927; and, in a match against Taranaki, he top-scored with 75 runs. The score included eight sixes, five of which were hit in successive scoring shots.

At the age of 31, on 19 March 1932 he made his first-class cricket debut in a match for Western Australia against the touring South African national cricket team at the WACA Ground. He was dismissed for six in the first innings by Cyril Vincent and for two in the second by Denys Morkel.

In February 1932, when batting for the West Perth Cricket Club, he scored 132 runs.

Boxing
He fought for the Amateur Welterweight championship of Victoria on 21 July 1923. He lost the bout to a controversial decision.<ref>Victorian Titles Sought: Decision Questioned, The Weekly Times, (Saturday, 28 July 1923), p.72; [https://trove.nla.gov.au/newspaper/article/140823299 Boxing, The Australasian, (Saturday, 28 July 1923), p.25]; Boxing and Wrestling, The Age, (Monday, 23 July 1923), p.7.</ref>

Motor sport
Wood was also the joint holder of several Transcontinental Motoring records, established with Dr. Alan MacKay, in 1927, in an Essex Super Six.Motoring, The (Yorketown) Pioneer, (Friday, 9 December 1927), p.4; Overland Record, The Newcastle Sun, (Tuesday, 6 December 1927), p.2.

Military service
He enlisted in the RAAF in 1939, and transferred to the Army in 1940. Wood was a Sergeant in the 2/16th Battalion of the Second AIF. He was killed in action, on 9 June 1941, during the Battle of the Litani River.
     From what I heard, he went out in the way you would expect of him – in the very van where things were hottest, and in front of his men he got what he was apparently destined for. No one could ever question his courage. I only wish I had half as much myself.     He was, I gather, wounded, and was being treated by the first-aid men, when a mortar came along and completely wiped out the whole party. He would know nothing about it. He met the finest fate a man can meet – a quick and painless death in the face of the enemy. We all know that this is the way he would have chosen it.

Legacy
 Golfers in the annual Anzac Day event at the Royal Perth Golf Club play for the Barney Wood Memorial Trophy, named in Wood's honour in 1941. Wood had been elected the Club's captain in 1935; and the cup had originally been presented to Wood, himself, at the end of his term as club captain.P. B. Wood Trophy at Royal Perth Golf, The (Perth) Sunday Times, (Sunday, 12 October 1941), p.10.

See also
 List of Victorian Football League players who died in active service
 List of Western Australia first-class cricketers

Footnotes

References

 Brown, Frank, Australian Corinthian, The Sporting Globe, (Saturday, 25 February 1928), p.6.
 Late Sgt. "Barney" Wood was a Fine Sportsman, The Dandenong Journal, (Wednesday, 2 July 1941), p.5.
 Popular Sportsman: Death of Sergeant B. Wood, The West Australian, (Tuesday, 24 June 1941), p.6.
 Roll of Honour: Percy Barnes Wood (WX4544), Australian War Memorial.
 Commonwealth War Graves Commission, Sergeant Wood, Percy Barnes (WX4544).
 World War Two Nominal Roll: Sergeant Percy Barnes Wood (WX4544).: note that it shows his year of birth as 1905.
 Batchelder, A., Melbourne Cricket Club: Roll of Honour 1939–1945, Melbourne Cricket Club, (Melbourne), 1995.
 Holmesby, Russell & Main, Jim (2007). The Encyclopedia of AFL Footballers. Melbourne: Bas Publishing 7th edition.
 Main, J. & Allen, D., "Wood, 'Barney' Percy", pp. 353–355 in Main, J. & Allen, D., Fallen – The Ultimate Heroes: Footballers Who Never Returned From War, Crown Content, (Melbourne), 2002. 
 McCrery, N., The Coming Storm: Test and First-Class Cricketers Killed in World War Two'', Pen and Sword, (Barnesley), 2017.

External links

 
 Demonwiki Profile: Barney Wood.
Cricinfo profile

1901 births
1941 deaths
People educated at Melbourne Grammar School
Australian rules footballers from Victoria (Australia)
Old Melburnians Football Club players
Melbourne Football Club players
Perth Football Club players
VFL/AFL players born outside Australia
New Zealand players of Australian rules football
Australian cricketers
Western Australia cricketers
Australian military personnel killed in World War II
New Zealand emigrants to Australia
Australian Army personnel of World War II
Australian Army soldiers